This is a list of all players who have scored five or more tries in a single game in the National Rugby League and its predecessor competitions.

Currently active players are listed in bold.

References

See also

List of players with 1,000 NRL points
List of players with 20 NRL field goals
List of players with 100 NRL tries and 500 NRL goals
List of players with 500 NRL goals
List of players who have played 300 NRL games

Lists of rugby league players
Players with five tries in a game